Donnie Condit (born December 11, 1956) is an American politician who served in the Oklahoma House of Representatives from the 18th district from 2010 to 2018.

References

1956 births
Living people
Democratic Party members of the Oklahoma House of Representatives